Neno Stoyanov Terziyski (born 23 March 1964) is a Bulgarian weightlifter who competed in the 1980s and 1990s. He won three World and four European championships and competed in the 1992 Summer Olympics, finishing fourth.

He set eleven world records in the 52 and one in the 56 kg weight class.

From 2004 to 2007 he was head coach of the Bulgarian men's weightlifting team.

References

External links 
Profile at Sports-Reference.com
Profile at Sports-org

Living people
1964 births
Bulgarian male weightlifters
Weightlifters at the 1992 Summer Olympics
World Weightlifting Championships medalists
Olympic weightlifters of Bulgaria
European Weightlifting Championships medalists
20th-century Bulgarian people
21st-century Bulgarian people